The Other Half may refer to:

Film and television
 The Other Half (game show), a BBC television game show
 The Other Half (TV series), an American day-time talk show
 The Other Half (1919 film), a film directed by King Vidor
 The Other Half (2006 Chinese film), a film directed by Ying Liang
 The Other Half (2016 film), a Canadian romance film

Music
 The Other Half (band), an American psychedelic hard rock band, active in the 1960s
 The Other Half, a Canadian 2000s tour band started by Leslie Carter
 Other Half (album), a 2007 album by Mandy Chiang

Other
 The Other Half, a replaceable back cover to the Jolla phone using I2C for expansion capabilities.